Angioleiomyoma (vascular leiomyoma, angiomyoma) of the skin is thought to arise from vascular smooth muscle, and is generally acquired.

See also
Leiomyoma
Skin lesions

References

External links 

Dermal and subcutaneous growths